Laydah Anitae Samani (born 18 February 1992) is a Solomon Islands women's footballer and former captain of the national women's team. She plays for the Royal Solomon Islands Police Force Royals, winners of the inaugural Solrais Women's Premier League 2020, as well as the Solrais Women's Football Championship in the same year.

Early life 
Samani is from Malaita.

Club career 
In June 2016 Samani joined Wellington United, becoming the first player from the Solomon Islands to play in New Zealand.

In 2018 Samani was a forward for Solomon Warriors.

As of 2020, she was playing for the Royal Solomon Islands Police Force Royals.

International career
Samani made her international debut for the Solomon Islands in the country's first women's international match on 9 April 2007, starting in the 2007 OFC Women's Championship match against Papua New Guinea. In 2009 she was shortlisted for the OFC Women's Player of the Year Award.

She captained the Solomon Islands team for the 2018 OFC Women's Nations Cup.

In 2021 she was selected as a women's football ambassador for the Oceania Football Confederation.

Career statistics

Scores and results list the Solomon Islands' goal tally first, score column indicates score after each Samani goal.

References

External links
 Profile at oceaniafootball.com

1992 births
Living people
Solomon Islands women's footballers
Women's association football forwards
Solomon Islands women's international footballers
Wellington United players
Solomon Warriors F.C. players
Solomon Islands expatriate footballers
Solomon Islands expatriate sportspeople in New Zealand
Expatriate association footballers in New Zealand